The 2023 Men's Junior Pan American Championship is the 13th edition of the Men's Pan American Junior Championship, the men's international under-21 field hockey championship of the Americas organized by the Pan American Hockey Federation.

The tournament is held alongside the women's tournament at the Wildey Hockey Centre in Saint Michael, Barbados and is originally scheduled to take place from 10 to 17 April 2023. 

The tournament serves as a direct qualifier for the 2023 Junior World Cup, with the winner and runner-up qualifying.

Preliminary round

Pool A

Pool B

Classification round

Fifth to seventh place classification

Crossover

Fifth place game

Final round

Bracket

Semi-finals

Third place game

Final

See also
 2023 Women's Pan-Am Junior Championship

References

Pan American Junior Championship
Pan American Junior Championship
Pan American Junior Championship
Pan American Championship
International field hockey competitions hosted by Barbados